Worlds Apart is the fourth studio album by the Canadian neo-progressive rock band Saga and was originally released in 1981. The album was produced by Rupert Hine, and has been released with several different covers.  Frontman Michael Sadler stated in the band's video DVD Silhouette (2002) that Hine told him to stop "singing like a choir boy". Sadler's vocal style was noticeably different on Worlds Apart than on the first three Saga albums; he kept that style in successive performances with the band. Hine reportedly had Sadler climb to the roof of the English barn where the band was recording in order to get the proper emotion from Sadler for "On the Loose".

Success
Widely considered Saga's best album (and certainly their most commercially successful), the album has become the band's most recognizable work to date.  The first song on the album, "On the Loose" was a single that hit No. 26 on the Billboard Hot 100 and No. 3 on the Top Rock Tracks chart in late 1982 and early 1983, their highest chart performance.  The single was helped by a music video which appeared on MTV during the station's inaugural year on the air.  Videos were also made for the singles "Wind Him Up" (#22 Canada) and "Amnesia".  The success of the album was also largely credited to an expanded tour schedule which saw the band enter new territories and venues, particularly in the United States where they opened for Billy Squier, to expand their musical presence.  Worlds Apart has been certified Platinum in Canada (100,000) and Gold in Germany (250,000), Denmark (50,000), United States (500,000), and Norway (15,000). The album was released on Maze Records in Canada, Portrait CBS Records in America and England, and Polydor Records for the remainder of the global market.

The Chapters
Two of the songs, "No Regrets (Chapter V)" and "No Stranger (Chapter VIII)", were part of a series of eight (but later sixteen) songs that Saga included within their first four albums called "The Chapters", which told the story of a young Albert Einstein.  The release of these two chapters completed the original set of eight.  These songs were also later included on The Chapters Live (2005).  To date, there has been no official compilation of the chapters in their studio incarnation.

Worlds Apart Revisited
In 2007, Saga released Worlds Apart Revisited (2005), a double-CD live album that included all the songs from the original Worlds Apart album.

Track listing

Note
 The track order shown above is for the original vinyl LP release.  Later CD releases and the Canadian vinyl pressing on Maze Records have "Time's Up" as track #2, followed by "Wind Him Up", "Amnesia", and "Framed" in positions #3, #4 and #5, respectively.  Some CD releases listed the tracks in the original LP order, meaning tracks #2 through #5 were mislabeled.
 On the Portrait version of Worlds Apart, the spoken intro of "Amnesia" is missing. The intro is sampled from the Tom & Jerry cartoon "Nitty Witty Kitty": "It say here, a sharp blow on the head is a sure cure for amnesia, and that's what he's gonna get!"
 The album was released internationally. In some markets it was released on Polydor Records, and in South America, Mexico and other Latin American markets it was released by CBS Records, Epic Records and CBS Discos

Personnel
Saga:
 Michael Sadler – lead vocals (all but 7), Moog synthesizer, keyboards
 Ian Crichton – guitar
 Jim Gilmour – lead synthesizer, keyboards, backing and lead (7) vocals, clarinet
 Jim Crichton – bass guitar, Yamaha electric grand piano, Moog bass synthesizer, keyboards
 Steve Negus – acoustic & electronic drums, percussion

Production:
 Produced by Rupert Hine
 Recorded & engineered by Stephen W Tayler
 Assistant engineers: Ian Morais & David Rolfe
 Mastered by Bob Ludwig

Charts

Weekly charts

Year-end charts

References

External links 
 Saga - Worlds Apart (1981) album credits & user reviews at ProgArchives.com
 Saga - Worlds Apart (1981) album to be listened on Spotify
 
  - Worlds Apart Revisited

1981 albums
Saga (band) albums
Portrait Records albums
Albums produced by Rupert Hine